Parasteatoda is a genus of comb-footed spiders that was first described by Allan Frost Archer in 1946. The name is a combination of the Ancient Greek "para-", meaning "near" or "next to", and the theridiid genus Steatoda. The Japanese name for this genus is O-himogumo zoku ("thread silk spider family").

Description

Parasteatoda species have a characteristic teardrop-shaped abdomen, with the anterior section much higher than the carapace and the spinnerets pointed downwards. The abdomen's colouration is highly variable, both between and often within species. They have slight sexual dimorphism; males are visually similar to females, although slightly smaller.

Species
It is mostly an Old World genus, with many species found in Asia and New Guinea, though the distribution reaches into Europe. A few species originate from the New World, but many have been introduced, and they are becoming more widespread in the Americas and Europe.

 it contains forty-two species and two subspecies:
Parasteatoda aequipeiformis Yang, Irfan & Peng, 2019 – China
Parasteatoda angulithorax (Bösenberg & Strand, 1906) – Russia (Far East), China, Korea, Japan
Parasteatoda asiatica (Bösenberg & Strand, 1906) – China, Korea, Japan
Parasteatoda camura (Simon, 1877) – Philippines, New Guinea, Solomon Is.
Parasteatoda celsabdomina (Zhu, 1998) – India, China, Thailand, Laos
Parasteatoda cingulata (Zhu, 1998) – China
Parasteatoda corrugata Yoshida, 2016 – Japan
Parasteatoda culicivora (Bösenberg & Strand, 1906) – China, Japan
Parasteatoda daliensis (Zhu, 1998) – China, Laos
Parasteatoda decorata (L. Koch, 1867) – Indonesia (Krakatau), New Guinea, Australia (Queensland)
Parasteatoda ducta (Zhu, 1998) – China
Parasteatoda galeiforma (Zhu, Zhang & Xu, 1991) – China
Parasteatoda gui (Zhu, 1998) – China
Parasteatoda hammeni (Chrysanthus, 1963) – New Guinea
Parasteatoda hatsushibai Yoshida, 2009 – Japan
Parasteatoda jinghongensis (Zhu, 1998) – China
Parasteatoda kaindi (Levi, Lubin & Robinson, 1982) – New Guinea
Parasteatoda kentingensis Yoshida, 2015 – Taiwan
Parasteatoda kompirensis (Bösenberg & Strand, 1906) – India, China, Korea, Japan
Parasteatoda lanyuensis (Yoshida, Tso & Severinghaus, 2000) – Taiwan
Parasteatoda longiducta (Zhu, 1998) – China
Parasteatoda lunata (Clerck, 1757) – Europe, Turkey, Israel, Caucasus, Russia (Europe to Far East), Iran
Parasteatoda l. serrata (Franganillo, 1930) – Cuba
Parasteatoda merapiensis Yoshida & Takasuka, 2011 – Indonesia (Java)
Parasteatoda nigrovittata (Keyserling, 1884) – Mexico to Argentina
Parasteatoda oxymaculata (Zhu, 1998) – China, India, Laos
Parasteatoda palmata Gao & Li, 2014 – China
Parasteatoda polygramma (Kulczyński, 1911) – New Guinea
Parasteatoda quadrimaculata (Yoshida, Tso & Severinghaus, 2000) – Taiwan
Parasteatoda ryukyu (Yoshida, 2000) – Japan, Ryukyu Is., Taiwan
Parasteatoda simulans (Thorell, 1875) – Europe, Turkey, Caucasus, Russia (Europe to South Siberia)
Parasteatoda songi (Zhu, 1998) – China
Parasteatoda subtabulata (Zhu, 1998) – China
Parasteatoda subvexa (Zhu, 1998) – China
Parasteatoda tabulata (Levi, 1980) – Tropical Asia. Introduced to North America, Europe, Georgia, Russia (Europe to Far East), Central Asia, China, Korea, Japan
Parasteatoda taiwanica Yoshida, 2015 – Taiwan
Parasteatoda tepidariorum (C. L. Koch, 1841) (type) – South America. Introduced to Canada, USA, Seychelles, Europe, Turkey, Caucasus, Russia (Europe to Far East), Kazakhstan, Iran, Central Asia, China, Japan, New Zealand, Hawaii
Parasteatoda t. australis (Thorell, 1895) – Myanmar
Parasteatoda transipora (Zhu & Zhang, 1992) – China
Parasteatoda triangula (Yoshida, 1993) – Singapore, Indonesia (Java, Bali)
Parasteatoda valoka (Chrysanthus, 1975) – New Guinea, Papua New Guinea (New Britain)
Parasteatoda vervoorti (Chrysanthus, 1975) – New Guinea
Parasteatoda wangi Jin & Zhang, 2013 – China
Parasteatoda wau (Levi, Lubin & Robinson, 1982) – New Guinea

Formerly included:
P. brookesiana (Barrion & Litsinger, 1995) (Transferred to Nihonhimea)
P. campanulata (Chen, 1993) (Transferred to Campanicola)
P. ferrumequina (Bösenberg & Strand, 1906) (Transferred to Campanicola)
P. japonica (Bösenberg & Strand, 1906) (Transferred to Nihonhimea)
P. mundula (L. Koch, 1872) (Transferred to Nihonhimea)
P. mundula (Chrysanthus, 1963) (Transferred to Nihonhimea)
P. oculiprominens Saito, 1939 (Transferred to Keijiella)
P. tesselata (Keyserling, 1884) (Transferred to Nihonhimea)

In synonymy:
P. boqueronica (Kraus, 1955) = Parasteatoda nigrovittata (Keyserling, 1884)
P. krausi (Chrysanthus, 1963) = Parasteatoda camura (Simon, 1877)
P. lunata (Olivier, 1789) = Parasteatoda lunata (Clerck, 1757)
P. mesax Levi, 1959 = Parasteatoda nigrovittata (Keyserling, 1884)
P. nipponica (Yoshida, 1983) = Parasteatoda tabulata (Levi, 1980)
P. obnubila (Keyserling, 1891) = Parasteatoda nigrovittata (Keyserling, 1884)
P. pallida (Walckenaer, 1841) = Parasteatoda tepidariorum (C. L. Koch, 1841)

See also

 List of Theridiidae species

References

Further reading

Araneomorphae genera
Spiders of Africa
Spiders of Asia
Spiders of North America
Spiders of Oceania
Spiders of South America
Theridiidae